Rick Sena Leal Noleto (born 6 August 1997), commonly known as Rick Sena, is a Brazilian footballer who currently plays as a midfielder for Covilhã.

Career statistics

Club

Notes

References

1997 births
Living people
Brazilian footballers
Brazilian expatriate footballers
Association football midfielders
Cruzeiro Esporte Clube players
C.S. Marítimo players
S.C. Covilhã players
Liga Portugal 2 players
Brazilian expatriate sportspeople in Portugal
Expatriate footballers in Portugal
Sportspeople from Tocantins